Benejúzar is a town and municipality located in the comarca of Vega Baja del Segura, in the province of Alicante, Spain. Benejúzar has an area of 9.3 km² and, according to the 2005 census, a total population of 5,249 inhabitants. The economy of Benejúzar is mainly based on agriculture (lime farming). The most important monument in the city is the Catholic church of Virgen del Rosario, built in 1611.

Notable people
Rufete, footballer

References

External links 
 Excelentísimo Ayuntamiento de Benejúzar, Town Hall of Benejúzar.

Municipalities in the Province of Alicante
Vega Baja del Segura